Zercoseius is a genus of mites in the family Ascidae.

Species
 Zercoseius paliger (Berlese, 1916)      
 Zercoseius spathuliger (Leonardi, 1899)

References

Ascidae